Ishmeet Singh Music Institute is a music institute in the memory of the singer Ishmeet Singh at Ludhiana. It was established by Government of Punjab in the year 2010.

References 

Punjabi music